Chimaobi Nwaogazi (born 27 November 1979 in Nigeria) is a Nigerian former footballer who is last known to have played for Wollongong Wolves of the Australian lower leagues.

Career

Australia

Although despondent over the death of his father and brother in late 2003, Nwaogazi adapted to Australia well, finding the net in six straight games for Wollongong Wolves, almost equalling the National Soccer League record held by Damian Mori. He ended up tying the record, scoring his 7th the next round.

Singapore

One of Geylang United's foreigners for the 2005 S.League, the Nigerian striker came to the club with high expectations, impressing with his form during pre-season. However, making his debut in a 4-4 draw with Home United, he failed to find the net by his third outing. Even then, coach Scott O'Donell put his faith on Nwaogazi but he left in mid-season.

References

External links 
 

1979 births
Nigerian footballers
Nigerian expatriate footballers
Marconi Stallions FC players
Geylang International FC players
Living people
Association football forwards
Expatriate soccer players in Australia
Singapore Premier League players
Wollongong Wolves FC players
Nigerian expatriate sportspeople in Australia
Expatriate footballers in Singapore